Blaster Master: Overdrive is a platforming and run and gun video game released by Sunsoft and Gaijinworks as a WiiWare title for the Wii game console. It is the first reboot of the formula and soundtrack of the original Blaster Master game, also produced by Sunsoft, in 1988.

Plot
The game's plot is based on an Earth that has become infected with a virus that has caused animals to be transformed into monsters that threaten humanity.  Alex, a world-leading biologist, takes the fight to the mutations to find the source of the virus, using an armored vehicle called  S.O.P.H.I.A. to battle against the creatures.

Gameplay

The gameplay reuses much of the same concepts of the original Blaster Master title. In side-scrolling sections, the players controls S.O.P.H.I.A. to progress through terrain spaces, gaining power-ups needed to face tougher monsters and progress to new areas.  At times, the player can have Alex leave S.O.P.H.I.A. and enter smaller caves, at which point the perspective is turned to a top-down run-and-gun game, where the player controls Alex directly, using weapons and gaining upgrades to explore the caves and defeat boss characters.

Development
In December 2009, Sunsoft revealed that they wanted to rebuild the Sunsoft brand in North America, and teamed with United States publisher Gaijinworks to bring the original Blaster Master as a Virtual Console title for the Wii. At the time, Vic Ireland, owner of Gaijinworks, stated that: 

Blaster Master: Overdrive was announced on February 6, 2010, only 2 days before its North America release on WiiWare. On release, the game was criticized only to support one controller configuration (using the Wii Remote in a horizontal alignment in the same manner as the original Nintendo Entertainment System controllers; Ireland stated that he was working with Sunsoft to help implement a patch to include alternative control schemes, including through use of the Classic Controller.

Reception

Blaster Master: Overdrive received "mixed" reviews according to the review aggregation website Metacritic.

Critics praised the title as a modern upgrade to a classic Nintendo Entertainment System game, but identified faults with its controls and lack of progressive scan support that limited the graphics quality. John Meyer of Wired identified the game as the "most faithful to the original" of the other attempts to recapture the Blaster Master gameplay, improving on the original game by adding a map screen and tweaking the gameplay in the top-down sections, but noted the default, uncustomized controls, placing the strafing action button on the backside of the remote would lead to hand cramping. Bob Mackey of 1UP.com noted the game, while still remaining challenging, "manages to iron out a few unforgivable aspects" of the original Blaster Master, but also lamented that the improved gameplay in the top-down sections suffered from the choice of controls.

References

External links
 

2010 video games
Metroidvania games
Platform games
Run and gun games
Sunsoft games
Video game prequels
Video games developed in Japan
Wii games
Wii-only games
WiiWare games
Single-player video games
Blaster Master
Gaijinworks games